Tim Kano is a New Zealand actor, known for playing Leo Tanaka in the Australian television soap opera Neighbours from 2016 until 2022. He also stars in the 2021 horror film Great White.

Early life
Kano's mother Sue is from New Zealand with Irish heritage, and his father Fujio, was Japanese. Kano was born in Christchurch and grew up between Wellington, New Zealand and Japan with his sister Maya. Upon returning to New Zealand after spending his primary school years in Japan, Kano took modelling and acting jobs and completed a media and film studies course. Kano returned to Japan to study Political Science at university in Tokyo. Working in politics was a goal for Kano, who worked for MP Chris Carter for a year.

Career 
Beginning his career in New Zealand, Kano played an extra in The Lord of the Rings and had some other small parts in TV and movies from 2001.

Kano's big break came when he joined Australian soap opera, Neighbours in 2016 as Leo Tanaka. He obtained the role after auditioning for both parts of twin brother roles, with the second twin role of David Tanaka eventually going to Takaya Honda.

With the goal of making a life in Hollywood, Kano left Neighbours in 2019, but made a return in 2021.

In 2019, Kano filmed the movie Great White and played Joji, a Japanese businessman.

In 2021, Kano played Ian in the TV comedy series, The Power of the Dream. He also featured in the Paramount+ comedy series Spreadsheet.

Personal life 
Kano resides in Melbourne with his dog and is a fan of 1950s American men's style.

Once a singer in a punk band, Kano can also play guitar.

Franklin Fisher of the band Algiers, is Kano's brother in-law.

In 2018, Kano was nominated as a Cosmopolitan Bachelor of the Year.

Filmography

References

External links

New Zealand male film actors
New Zealand male television actors
1986 births
New Zealand male soap opera actors
New Zealand people of Irish descent
New Zealand people of Japanese descent
People from Christchurch
Living people